The Cayton Guard Station or Cayton Ranger Station, in White River National Forest about  south of Silt, Colorado, was built in 1910.  It was listed on the National Register of Historic Places in 2005.

It includes a three-room log cabin.

Its preservation is supported by the Cayton Ranger Station Foundation.

References

External links
Cayton Ranger Station Foundation

Log cabins in the United States
United States Forest Service ranger stations
National Register of Historic Places in Mesa County, Colorado
Buildings and structures completed in 1910